Beachmaster or beach master may refer to:

 A military officer in charge of the disembarkation phase of amphibious warfare
 One of two US Navy amphibious beach party units:
 Beachmaster Unit One, based in Coronado, California
 Beachmaster Unit Two, based in Little Creek, Virginia
A dominant male of some pinniped species, most often an elephant seal

In literature:
Beachmasters, a 1985 novel by Australian author Thea Astley
"Beachmaster", a 2009 poem by Clive James